John Erasmus Blackett (1 January 1729 – 11 June 1814) was a Newcastle upon Tyne businessman and Mayor of Newcastle after whom Blackett Street in central Newcastle is named. He was the father-in-law of Admiral Lord Collingwood, second-in-command to Lord Nelson at the Battle of Trafalgar.

Blackett was born in Newcastle on 1 January 1728/9, a younger son of John Blackett (1683-1750) and Patience Wise, the daughter of Henry Wise, and a grandson of Sir Edward Blackett, 2nd Bt. He was named after a close friend of his father, Erasmus Lewis, secretary to Lord Oxford.

After serving an apprenticeship in Liverpool under major Liverpool slave trader Foster Cunliffe, he became a partner in a Newcastle coal dealership and was for some years steward of the lead mines of his 2nd cousin Sir Walter Blackett. He was one of the original partners of the Newcastle upon Tyne Fire Office, now part of Aviva plc. He was prominent in Newcastle public life, becoming an Alderman and serving as Mayor four times (in 1765, 1772, 1780 and 1790). He was manager of his cousin’s estate at Wallington Hall in Northumberland, importing slave-produced Jamaican rum.

John Erasmus Blackett died in Newcastle on 11 June 1814 and is buried in St. Nicholas's Church. In 1761 he had married Sarah Roddam and in 1791 their daughter Sarah married Cuthbert Collingwood, a Royal Navy officer who in 1805, as Vice Admiral Collingwood, was second-in-command to Lord Nelson at the Battle of Trafalgar.

More than ten years after his death, his name was given to Blackett Street, constructed as part of the redevelopment of Grainger Town, in the centre of Newcastle.

References 

1729 births
1814 deaths
History of Newcastle upon Tyne
18th-century merchants
Mayors of Newcastle upon Tyne